Antonin Michel is a French Language Scrabble player who has also competed in English. He has won the French National Championship four times, the World Championship twice and finished 95th in the 1999 English World Championship.

Career biography
Antonin shocked the Scrabble World in 1987 when he won the Junior World Championship - aged just nine years old. The upper age limit was 15. His next major success was winning the French National title in 1998, and shocked the Scrabble community again by competing in the English World Championship the next year - although he finished a disappointing 8 wins out of 24, -951 points, 95th place out of 98 competitors.

He would win the French title three more times, 2003-05 but would only finish tenth in 2006 despite only missing one top.

He became World Champion for the first time in 2005, with arguably the most dominating performance in the championships' history. He dropped just 4 points over 7 games, a championship record. He also won the blitz event, the pairs event, and the défi mondial (a sort of play-off game). No other player has ever won these four events together in the same championship. He finished second in 2006 but won the World Championship in 2007 having lost only 9 points over 7 games. He became the 7th player in 36 years to win the championship more than once.

Career statistics

 World Champion 2005, 2007
 National Champion (France) 1998, 2003, 2004, 2005
 National Pairs Champion
 with Fabien Douté (2003, 2004)
with Olivier Bernardin (2006)
with Thierry Chincholle (2007)
 World Blitz Champion 2001, 2004, 2005, 2006, 2008
 World Pairs Champion
 with Fabien Fontas (2001)
 with Philippe Lorenzo (2004)
 with Alain Jacques (2005)
 with Anthony Clémenceau (2006)
 Represented France in the English World Scrabble Championship in 1999
 Ranked 2nd in the FISF French World Scrabble ratings (May 2008)

See also

Francophone Scrabble
Duplicate Scrabble

External links
 The finishing positions of the competitors in the 1999 WSC
 a list of all the World Champions from 1972 to the present day (in French)

French Scrabble players
Living people
Year of birth missing (living people)